The Port of Poole is a cross channel port on Poole Harbour in Poole, Dorset, South West England. Along with Weymouth Harbour, Poole has the other major Channel Port in Dorset.

History 
In World War II, the port was used in the Normandy landings.

In 2017, a D-Day veteran and the last known Mark 4 landing craft tank, LCT 728, was rediscovered rotting in Poole Harbour at the Port alongside another unknown Mark 3, possibly LCT(4) 510. They were used as floating barges in the 1950s.

In November 2020, the Port set up a flu vaccination service and also received £86,000 for the Brexit transition period.

In December 2020, it was reported by BBC News that Bournemouth, Christchurch and Poole Council is preparing a bid for free Port status post Brexit. The bid for becoming a special economic zone includes Bournemouth Airport.

In April 2021, the port set up equipment at the cruise terminal to deal with the COVID-19 pandemic.

Economy 

The Port of Poole is a major destination the cruising, as well as for international trade for imports and exports of cargo. A fishing industry is also present.

Immigration 
It has been reported that the Port of Poole is a target for Illegal immigration to the United Kingdom. In 2017, 18 migrants were found including children in a lorry. The local MP for Poole Robert Syms has called on the government and the Minister of State for Immigration to provide more resources to deal with the issue. The Port has a border control post.

Services 
The Port is used by Brittany Ferries. and Condor Ferries. The ferry crossing to Cherbourg in France is the shortest crossing of Brittany Ferries. In the Summer of 2020, the Cherbourg services were cancelled due to the COVID-19 pandemic.

Poole Port also has a Border Force Post.

Transportation 

The Port of Poole uses Optare MetroRiders for passengers commuting.

References

External links 

 Official website

Juxtaposed border controls
Poole Harbour
Buildings and structures in Poole
Ports and harbours of England
Ports and harbours of the English Channel